Dick Clark's Live Wednesday is a 1978 NBC variety television series, sometimes called simply Live Wednesday.  Hosted by Dick Clark, it was a musical show much like Clark's American Bandstand. Announcers on the series included Jerry Bishop and Charlie O'Donnell.  Guests included musical artists and actors such as Diana Ross, Frankie Avalon, Bo Diddley, Connie Francis, Annette Funicello, Melissa Gilbert, Donna Summer, Bobbie Gentry, Melissa Manchester and Andy Kaufman. Most episodes also included a live stunt, designed to emphasize the aspect of the telecast, which was seen live in the eastern US.

Comedians such as Billy Crystal, Rodney Dangerfield, David Steinberg, Jimmie Walker, David Brenner and Nipsey Russell also performed on the show.

References

External links
 

NBC original programming
1978 American television series debuts
1978 American television series endings
Television series by Dick Clark Productions
1970s American variety television series
1970s American music television series
Dick Clark